Regina is a suite of mathematical software for 3-manifold topologists. It focuses upon the study of 3-manifold triangulations and includes support for normal surfaces and angle structures.

Features 

 Regina implements a variant of Rubinstein's 3-sphere recognition algorithm.  This is an algorithm that determines whether or not a triangulated 3-manifold is homeomorphic to the 3-sphere.
 Regina further implements the connect-sum decomposition.  This will decompose a triangulated 3-manifold into a connect-sum of triangulated prime 3-manifolds.
 Homology and Poincare duality for 3-manifolds, including the torsion linking form.
 Includes portions of the SnapPea kernel for some geometric calculations.
 Has both a GUI and Python interface.

See also 

 Computational topology

References

Mathematical software